St Mary's Church, Ashwell may refer to:
 St Mary's Church, Ashwell, Hertfordshire
 St Mary's Church, Ashwell, Rutland